Raffiella Chapman (born 11 October 2007) is a British teenage actress with British, Italian and Indian heritage who has starred in many notable films and TV series, including The Theory of Everything, Miss Peregrine's Home for Peculiar Children, His Dark Materials and Infinite.

Raffiella plays the lead role of Vesper in dystopian sci-fi movie Vesper, released in 2022.

Life 
Raffiella Chapman is the daughter of actor Dom Chapman and screenwriter Emilia di Girolamo.

Filmography

Film

Television

References

External links 
 

English child actresses
English film actresses
English people of Italian descent
2007 births
Living people
English people of Indian descent
People from Hastings
English television actresses